Paradise Garden in Summerville, Georgia, was the home and workplace of Baptist minister and folk artist Howard Finster and is now a public park dedicated to his life and art. 

Paradise Garden, located at 200 North Lewis Street, is open to the public. It encompasses two and half acres densely filled with buildings, constructions, sculptures, and thousands of objects. Finster's former studio, a yellow, plank-sided bungalow, is now a visitors' center. From it, a path leads to a multi-layered, multi-sided building, the World Folk Art Chapel.

History
In 1961 Finster purchased four acres of land in Summerville, Georgia, and a few years later retired from his pastoral duties and devoted his time to working this land. It was always a work-in-progress, originally called Plant Farm Museum, but later known as Paradise Garden. Much of the land was swampy, which Finster drained himself. He laid out his collections of found objects which he had spent years accumulating. He built numerous sculptures, one made from castoff bicycle parts and another from old hubcaps. He built a structure lined inside and out  with pieces of mirrors. As an extension of his preaching  duties, he erected signs covered with Biblical verses or simple exhortations, such as "Yo Jesus."

In 1976, at the age of sixty-one, Finster began a new chapter of his life. While repairing a bicycle in his workshop at Paradise Garden, Finster had another vision. A smear of white paint on his finger tip looked to him like a human face and he heard a voice command that he "paint sacred art." This he did with boundless energy until his death.

These objects, largely based in the Bible, American history, and popular culture, filled Paradise Garden. Mostly painted on rough wood, they combined flat, two-dimensional images with dense writing. Roberta Smith, a critic for the New York Times, described Finster's work as "apocalyptic text-image paintings, which he seemed to produce at assembly-line rates. Their lush, extravagantly crowded surfaces form later-day illuminated manuscripts and cover subjects that included heaven and hell, tales from the Bible and American history and popular culture."  Finster's interests were seemingly endless. He painted Jesus, Elvis Presley, winged angels, George Washington, self-portraits, Marilyn Monroe wearing an American flag dress, demons, Coca-Cola bottles, the Mona Lisa, Mickey Mouse, policemen, cowboys, Old Testament prophets, and other subjects in a torrent. Stylistically, they were all of a piece: singular, simple, and bold.

Interest grew over the years and in 1991 Howard and his wife, Pauline, moved from Paradise Garden in order to escape the crush of visitors. He continued to work until his death in 2001. In the twenty-five years after hearing a voice in his workshop he had created an astonishing 46,000 sacred objects.

After Finster's death Paradise Garden began to decay into the heat and humidity of rural Georgia. His  family tried to maintain the site, with little success. The buildings' walls became water logged and decayed and their foundations crumbled. The paintings done on untreated lumber rotted. Kudzu and other vines engulfed what had been created. Finster's home and work began to  sink into the rich mud of the Chattooga River valley.

Eventually, Chattooga County acquired the site. In 2012 a non-profit group, Paradise Garden Foundation, signed a fifty-year lease with the county and took possession of Finster's property. The cost was one dollar.

The foundation's director has characterized its on-going work as a revival, "a way to restore the spirit of the place."  Structures have been reinforced. Sunken paintings and objects have been dug out of the ground, cleaned, and put on display. Other objects remain where they were originally placed, degenerating with time. Rotten lumber has been replaced. Buildings have been adapted to different uses. A brook has been dredged and now freely meanders through the site.

Garden details

In 1982 with a grant from the National Endowment for the Arts, Finster had purchased a small church adjacent to his property. It was a simple ranch building which he went on to expand dramatically, Finster's vision of "heavenly mansions". On top of the original structure, he built a four layer, twelve sided "wedding cake", ending with a spire shaped like an upside-down funnel. One level is a circular balcony, giving views of the entire site. A large painting inside the church illustrates Finster's cosmos. It is a landscape full of whirling stars and erupting volcanoes. Written across it is "Visions of Other Worlds   I took the pieces you threw away—put them together by night & day—washed by rain and dried by sun—a million pieces all in one."

Thousands of these pieces are used in a section called Mosaic Garden. Walls and pathways are embedded with shards of colored glass, shells, bits of mirrors, and broken pottery. Gaudi-esque follies of concrete glisten in the sun. The bicycle and hubcap sculptures remain. Finster's rusting objects fill sheds. There are two chapels decorated with his art. Trees are randomly hung with used bottles. Scattered through the site are colored glass domes from telephone poles. A fully illustrated and inscribed Cadillac sedan is parked. Nearby is a welded sculpture done by Finster's friend, Keith Haring.

Different areas of the Paradise Garden are connected by a L-shaped gallery on raised stilts. Its corrugated metal roof and planked siding echo the area's traditional agricultural buildings. Large windows bring in light and air. Inside, benches line both sides of the narrow, long space. Finster's paintings and writings are hung on the white walls. The Foundation treats the gallery as a work in progress. Newspaper clippings and testimonials are posted. Visitors have added graffiti. Others have left their works of art and objects as gifts.

The current Paradise Garden is both a restoration and expansion of Howard Finster's vision. Art Place America and the Educational Foundation of America have been major benefactors. The site is managed by the Paradise Garden Foundation and is staffed by hired professionals and a large body of volunteers. It is open to the public for self-guided tours. A guest cottage is available for over night stays. The Garden also may be rented for events with up to 250 people. An annual Finster Fest brings visitors, performers and artists from around the world.

References

paradisegardenfoundation.org

http://www.nytimes.com/2001/10/23/arts/howard-finster-folk-artist-and-preacher-dies-at-84.html

External links
 Paradise Garden Foundation

Parks in Georgia (U.S. state)
Sculpture gardens, trails and parks in the United States
Protected areas of Chattooga County, Georgia
Tourist attractions in Chattooga County, Georgia
Art in Georgia (U.S. state)
American folk art
Visionary_environments